Derrick Danta Barnes Jr. (born May 29, 1999) is an American football linebacker for the Detroit Lions of the National Football League (NFL). He played college football at Purdue and was drafted by the Lions in the fourth round of the 2021 NFL Draft.

Early life and high school
Barnes grew up in Covington, Kentucky and attended Holy Cross High School, where he played basketball and ran track in addition to playing linebacker and running back on the football team, coached by former Cincinnati Bengal, Bruce Kozerski. As a senior, he was named first-team All-State 
and the Class 2-A, District Six Player of the Year after leading the team with 126 tackles on defense and rushing for 1,567 yards and 22 touchdowns on 150 carries on offense. Barnes originally committed to play college football at Toledo going into his senior year, but changed his commitment to Purdue after receiving an offer from new head coach Jeff Brohm.

College career
Barnes played in 12 games with two starts during his freshman season. He became a starter as a sophomore and finished the season with 92 tackles with 8 tackles for loss and 3 sacks. After the regular season, he was moved to the defensive end position going into 2018 Music City Bowl. He stayed as a pass rusher during his junior season and finished the year tied for the second most sacks on the team with 7.5 along with 11.0 tackles for loss. As a senior, Barnes returned to the middle linebacker position and led the Boilermakers with 54 total tackles and was second on the team in tackles for loss with 5.5 and was named second-team All-Big Ten.

Professional career

Barnes was drafted in the fourth round, 113th overall, by the Detroit Lions in the 2021 NFL Draft. He signed his four-year rookie contract with Detroit on June 17, 2021.

Personal life
During the 11th Annual NFL Honors on February 10, 2022, NFL veteran and 2021 Walter Payton NFL Man of the Year Award winner Andrew Whitworth told a story about himself and Barnes reuniting after a 2021 Week 7 game between the Los Angeles Rams and Detroit Lions; Barnes approached Whitworth after the game to thank him for his earlier mentorship through Boys & Girls Clubs of Greater Cincinnati.

References

External links
Purdue Boilermakers bio

Living people
Players of American football from Kentucky
American football linebackers
Purdue Boilermakers football players
Sportspeople from Covington, Kentucky
Detroit Lions players
1999 births